The 2022 AIG Women's Open was played from 4 to 7 August in Scotland at Muirfield. It was the 46th Women's British Open, the 22nd as a major championship on the LPGA Tour, and the third championship held under a sponsorship agreement with AIG. It was the first Women's British Open to be hosted at Muirfield.

Field
The field was made up of 144 players. As with previous tournaments, most players earned exemptions based on past performance on the Ladies European Tour, the LPGA Tour, previous major championships, or with a high ranking in the Women's World Golf Rankings. The rest of the field earned entry by successfully competing in qualifying tournaments open to any female golfer, professional or amateur, with a low handicap.

Exemptions
Players who qualified for the event are listed below. Players are listed under the first category in which they qualified.

1. Winners of the Women's British Open, aged 60 or younger at the scheduled end of the championship, provided they are still active members of a recognised tour.

 Laura Davies
 Georgia Hall
 Ariya Jutanugarn
 Kim In-Kyung
 Stacy Lewis
 Mo Martin
 Catriona Matthew
 Anna Nordqvist
 Inbee Park
 Sophia Popov
 Hinako Shibuno

 Helen Alfredsson, Sophie Gustafson, Jang Jeong, Emilee Klein, Karen Lunn, Liselotte Neumann, Lorena Ochoa, Pak Se-ri, Jiyai Shin, Annika Sörenstam, Sherri Steinhauer, Karen Stupples, Yani Tseng, and Karrie Webb did not play

2. The top 10 finishers and ties from the 2021 Women's British Open.

 Louise Duncan
 Leonie Harm
 Moriya Jutanugarn
 Minjee Lee
 Nanna Koerstz Madsen
 Madelene Sagström
 Lizette Salas
 Patty Tavatanakit

 Marissa Steen did not play

3. The top 15 on the final 2021 LET Order of Merit.

 Pia Babnik
 Carlota Ciganda
 Olivia Cowan
 Lydia Hall
 Alice Hewson
 Charley Hull
 Stephanie Kyriacou
 Sanna Nuutinen
 Lee-Anne Pace
 Magdalena Simmermacher
 Marianne Skarpnord
 Maja Stark
 Atthaya Thitikul

4. The top 5 on the 2022 LET Order of Merit not already exempt as of 11 July.

 Casandra Alexander
 Becky Brewerton
 Johanna Gustavsson
 Whitney Hillier
 Michele Thomson

5. The top 35 on the final 2021 Race to the CME Globe points list.

 Pajaree Anannarukarn
 Céline Boutier
 Matilda Castren
 Chun In-gee
 Ally Ewing
 Mina Harigae
 Nasa Hataoka
 Brooke Henderson
 Megan Khang
 Kim Hyo-joo
 Kim Sei-young
 Ko Jin-young
 Lydia Ko
 Jessica Korda
 Nelly Korda
 Jennifer Kupcho
 Lee Jeong-eun
 Gaby López
 Leona Maguire
 Ryann O'Toole
 Ryu So-yeon
 Yuka Saso
 Lexi Thompson
 Amy Yang

6. The top 25 on the 2021 Race to the CME Globe points list not already exempt as of 11 July.

 Brittany Altomare
 Ashleigh Buhai
 Chella Choi
 Allisen Corpuz
 Perrine Delacour
 Gemma Dryburgh
 Jodi Ewart Shadoff
 Cheyenne Knight
 Maude-Aimee Leblanc
 Alison Lee
 Andrea Lee
 Caroline Masson
 Stephanie Meadow
 Annie Park
 Paula Reto
 Sarah Schmelzel
 Jenny Shin
 Lauren Stephenson
 Thidapa Suwannapura
 Emma Talley
 Kelly Tan
 Albane Valenzuela
 Lilia Vu
 Lindsey Weaver-Wright
 Angel Yin

7. The top 50 in the Women's World Golf Rankings as of 27 June.

 An Na-rin
 Choi Hye-jin
 Ayaka Furue
 Hong Jung-min
 Hsu Wei-ling
 Minami Katsu
 Lee Jeong-eun
 Lin Xiyu
 Yuna Nishimura
 Yealimi Noh
 Su-Hyun Oh
 Amy Olson
 Emily Kristine Pedersen
 Mel Reid
 Sophia Schubert

8. The top 3 on the JLPGA Money List not already exempt as of the Suntory Ladies Open (12 June)

 Kotone Hori
 Mao Saigo
 Sayaka Takahashi

9. The top 2 on the KLPGA Money List not already exempt as of 27 June

10. Winners of any recognised LET or LPGA Tour events in the 2022 calendar year.

 Marina Alex
 Manon De Roey
 Linn Grant
 Esther Henseleit
 Ji Eun-hee
 Tiia Koivisto
 Bronte Law
 Meghan MacLaren
 Jana Melichova (a)
 Morgane Métraux
 Ana Peláez

11. Winners of the 2021 JLPGA Money List and KLPGA Money List.

12. Winners of the last five editions of the U.S. Women's Open

 Kim A-lim

13. Winners of the last five editions of the Chevron Championship

14. Winners of the last five editions of the Women's PGA Championship

 Hannah Green
 Park Sung-hyun

15. Winners of the last five editions of The Evian Championship

 Angela Stanford

16. The leading two (not otherwise exempt) in the 2022 Suntory Ladies Open

 Saiki Fujita
 Miyu Yamashita

17. The 2021 Women's Amateur Asia-Pacific champion, 2021 Women's Amateur Latin America champion, 2022 Womens Amateur Championship champions, 2022 European Ladies Amateur Championship champion, the 2022 Augusta National Women's Amateur champion, the 2021 Mark H. McCormack Medal winner, and the highest ranked women in the World Amateur Golf Ranking from Great Britain and Ireland as of week 25, and provided they are still amateurs at the time of the championship.

 Jess  Baker (a)
 Anna Davis (a)
 Savannah De Bock (a)
 Mizuki Hashimoto (a)
 Caley McGinty (a)
 Valery Plata (a)
 Rose Zhang (a)

18. Any player who did not compete in the previous year's Women's British Open due to maternity, who subsequently received an extension of membership for the maternity from the player's home tour in the previous year, provided she was otherwise qualified to compete in the previous year's Women's British Open.

 Mariajo Uribe

19. The leading three players (not otherwise exempt) in the 2022 Trust Golf Women's Scottish Open

 Carmen Alonso
 Wichanee Meechai
 Chanettee Wannasaen

Final Qualifying
Final Qualifying event was played over 18 holes on 1 August at North Berwick. 12 qualifying places were available for the championship.

 Aditi Ashok
 Nicole Broch Estrup
 Jennifer Chang
 Peiyun Chien
 Lauren Coughlin
 Diksha Dagar
 Hayley Davis
 Céline Herbin
 Janie Jackson
 Ingrid Lindblad (a)
 Ursula Wikström
 Liz Young

Round summaries

First round
Thursday, 4 August 2022

Second round
Friday, 5 August 2022

Third round
Saturday, 6 August 2022

Final round
Sunday, 7 August 2022

Playoff
The sudden-death playoff was held over the 18th hole until there was a winner.

References

External links

Coverage on the LPGA Tour site
Coverage on the Ladies European Tour

Women's British Open
Golf tournaments in Scotland
British Open
British Open
British Open